United Gulf Bank (UGB) is a commercial bank located in Manama, Bahrain, founded in 1980.

UGB works under a wholesale banking licence from the Central Bank of Bahrain and is listed on the Bahrain Stock Exchange. From 1988 is a member of the Kuwait Projects Company Holding (KIPCO).

The bank building, UGB Tower, contains elements of the local architecture and energy saving features for the high-rise office buildings.

See also 

List of banks in Bahrain
List of banks in Asia

References

External links 
Homepage

Banks of Bahrain
Banks established in 1980
Companies based in Manama
Bahraini companies established in 1980